S-F-X (stylized with interpuncts as S･F･X) is a 1984 album by Japanese electronic musician Haruomi Hosono. The album is his first solo album after Yellow Magic Orchestra. Credited also is "Friends of Earth", as Hosono would later form a band with this name. The album is the first album released by label Non Standard, a record label created between Hosono and Teichiku Records to release the technopop/hip-hop styled material he worked on.

The 1988, 1993 and 2001 reissues of S-F-X contain tracks from Non-Standard Mixture, an EP created by Hosono the same year as the album.

Track listing

Vinyl/Cassette Version

CD Version

Personnel
Haruomi Hosono – vocals, lyrics, synthesizer, engineer
Miharu Koshi – vocals
Curtis Knapp – vocals
Makoto Kubota – vocals
Sandii – vocals
Yasuhiko Terada – engineer
Takashi Itoh – engineer
Matsutoshi Nishimura – bass

1984 albums
Haruomi Hosono albums